Sir Iain Glidewell PC (8 June 1924 – 8 May 2016) was a Lord Justice of Appeal and Judge of Appeal of the High Court of the Isle of Man.  He was made a privy councillor in 1985.

He was educated at Bromsgrove School and Worcester College, Oxford where he was later made an Honorary Fellow. At Gray's Inn, one of the four English Inns of Court, he held the positions of Treasurer (1995), and Master of the Bench.

In 1997 he was commissioned by the British government to review the Crown Prosecution Service. His report made recommendations to maximise efficiency within the prosecution process. Glidewell maintains the opinion that in the United Kingdom, QCs should be appointed following the recommendation of a panel chaired by a retired Law Lord or a Lord Justice of Appeal.

He died on 8 May 2016, aged 91.

References

1924 births
2016 deaths
20th-century English judges
Lords Justices of Appeal
Knights Bachelor
Members of the Privy Council of the United Kingdom
Alumni of Worcester College, Oxford
People educated at Bromsgrove School
Members of Gray's Inn
Place of birth missing